Ram Chandra Singh Yadav is an Indian politician. He was elected to the Bihar Legislative Assembly from Bhabua as a member of the Bahujan Samaj Party in 2005-2010. Yadav contested 2019 Indian general elections from Buxar as an Independent candidate but lost.

References

Living people
People from Kaimur district
Bihar MLAs 2005–2010
Rashtriya Janata Dal politicians
Year of birth missing (living people)